Kiunga bleheri is a species of blue-eyes from the subfamily Pseudomugilinae, part of the rainbowfish family Melanotaeniidae which is endemic to Papua New Guinea.

References

bleheri
Taxa named by Gerald R. Allen
Fish described in 2004
Endemic fauna of Papua New Guinea